Canby Creek is a stream in Yellow Medicine County, in the U.S. state of Minnesota.

Canby Creek took its name from the city of Canby, Minnesota.

See also
List of rivers of Minnesota

References

Rivers of Yellow Medicine County, Minnesota
Rivers of Minnesota